Tradition und Leben e.V. (TuL, "Tradition and Life"), was a monarchist organisation in Germany. It was registered in January 1959 in Cologne. Prior to that, a constitutional assembly took place in the autumn of 1958. Tradition und Leben provided a rallying point for all German royalists and supported all former German ruling houses.

Shortly after World War II, monarchists got together under the motto "Letters for Tradition und Leben." They followed partly the tradition of monarchist organisations and personalities from the time of the Weimar Republic (1919–1933), especially the "Bund der Aufrechten," founded in November 1918, and partly the older German traditionalist Völkisch movement of the 19th and early 20th centuries.

Tradition und Leben was thus linked with the oldest organisations of its kind and the most important in Germany.

The aim of Tradition und Leben is summed up by its motto: “We crown democracy!” indicating the desire for a modern, democratic kingdom. Members of Tradition und Leben believe that Germany should become a democratic parliamentary monarchy. Each June, the organization's representatives are among those who lay a wreath at former Kaiser Wilhelm's mausoleum at Huis Doorn, on the anniversary of his death. Doorn was his residence-in-exile in the Netherlands.

Tradition und Leben supported hereditary monarchy as the best guarantee for the performance of duty and the exercise of responsibility for the political well-being and the physical environment for each succeeding generation. Among other principles espoused by the organization are the following:

The principle of the separation of the head of state, parliament, and the executive.
Germany shall remain a federal state with monarchies and republics having equal rights under it. Dynasties should return to the throne in those German states where the people desire it. The interests of Länder affairs (the current Bundesrat) and Federal affairs (the current Bundestag) are to be represented in a system of two houses.
Monarchy guarantees solidarity between the German federal and länder governments and thus strengthens the European idea.
The monarch represents the interests of the people, being unrelated to party politics, and promotes public welfare.
The monarchy shall support European integration and play its part in peace and public welfare.
The aim of creating a modern and democratic kingdom shall be reached by peaceable means. Tradition und Leben guarantees this approach.
 The rightful claimant to the throne is the head of the House of Hohenzollern, Georg Friedrich of Prussia.

External links
 www.Tradition-und-Leben.de website (German & English)
 Harold Schmautz, TuL: “Working for the Impossible: Is a New German Monarchy Thinkable?”

Monarchist organizations
Political organisations based in Germany
German monarchists
Monarchism in Germany
1959 establishments in Germany
Organizations established in 1959